Shangguan Wan'er is a Chinese television series based on the life of Shangguan Wan'er, a female official in the court of Wu Zetian, the only female emperor in Chinese history. Starring Ruan Danning as the titular character, the series was first aired in mainland China in December 1998. The series was broadcast again in March 2003 on Sichuan Satellite TV.

Plot
Shangguan Wan'er was the granddaughter of Shangguan Yi, a government official. After Shangguan Yi tried to depose Empress Wu, his whole family was executed except for Wan'er and her mother, Lady Zheng. They were protected by another official named Pei Yan.

At the age of 15, Wan'er entered the Imperial Palace to become the study mate of the Crown Prince, Li Xian. They developed feelings for each other despite their backgrounds. However, Li Xian's beliefs contrasted from his mother's beliefs. Li Xian was deposed from his position as Crown Prince and was sentenced to death. Wan'er decides to find the truth and appeals to Empress Wu. Empress Wu is regretful and makes Wan'er her secretary. She was titled the world's number one lady.Even after all those years, Wan'er never forgot Li Xian. She kept his words at heart, and helped restore peace to the Tang dynasty. Wan'er enlisted the help of Di Renjie and Princess Taiping, and together they stopped the ambitions of Wu Sansi, Wu Chengsi, and Pei Yan. She dedicates the rest of her life to the Li family, and later becomes a consort to Li Xian's brother, Li Zhe.

Cast
 Ruan Danning as Shangguan Wan'er
 Zhang Qing as Wu Zetian
 Sun Yang as Princess Taiping
 Huang Haibing as Li Xian
 Ji Chenmu as Emperor Zhongzong
 Lu Shiyu as Emperor Ruizong
 Geng Yong as Empress Wei
 Fan Zhiqi as Pei Yan
 Tan Jianchang as Takashima Shin (Gaodao Xin)

List of songs
 Ren Shijian (人世间), the opening theme song, performed by Tu Meihua
 Mengxing (梦醒), the ending theme song, performed by Li Hong
 Tongxin Jie (同心结), insert song, performed by Xiao Chanjuan
 Tong Shi Tianya Lunluo Ren'' (同是天涯沦落人), insert song, performed by Tu Meihua

References

1998 Chinese television series debuts
1998 Chinese television series endings
Television series set in the Tang dynasty
Television series set in the Zhou dynasty (690–705)
1990s Chinese television series
Mandarin-language television shows
Chinese historical television series
Television series set in the 7th century